Georgios Gennimatas (1873 in Laconia – ??) was a Greek athlete. He competed at the 1896 Summer Olympics in Athens.

Gennimatas placed fourth or fifth (with the other place going to Henrik Sjöberg of Sweden) in his preliminary heat of the 100 metres competition and did not advance to the final.

References

External links

 

1873 births
Year of death missing
Greek male sprinters
Olympic athletes of Greece
Athletes (track and field) at the 1896 Summer Olympics
19th-century sportsmen
People from Laconia
Date of birth missing
Place of death missing
Sportspeople from the Peloponnese